The Redbus Internet Exchange ("RBIEX") was a not-for-profit neutral Internet Exchange Point situated in London, widely considered to be a vanity project of two small Docklands Internet service providers, Othello Technology and Netegral.  Due to the nature of its origins the exchange had very few members throughout its short life of approximately 2 years

Founded in April 2004, it was advertised as one of the Europe's newest and most cost effective peering points when in reality the actual value to businesses was quite the opposite due to the low number of potential peers available.  While it operated, Internet service providers could connect at Fast Ethernet speeds using IPv4 and IPv6 from any of the three London Redbus Interhouse data centres (Harbour Exchange, Meridian Gate & Sovereign House). 

The exchange shut down some time in 2006 to 2007 and although the IP address range is still announced by Netegral, the website no longer exists.

External links
 Official Website
 Looking Glass

Internet exchange points in the United Kingdom